Séileu is a town in the far west of Ivory Coast. It is a sub-prefecture of Danané Department in Tonkpi Region, Montagnes District.

Séileu was a commune until March 2012, when it became one of 1126 communes nationwide that were abolished.

In 2014, the population of the sub-prefecture of Séileu was 19,718.

Villages
The twenty seven villages of the sub-prefecture of Séileu and their population in 2014 are:

Notes

Sub-prefectures of Tonkpi
Former communes of Ivory Coast